Sascha Licht (born 27 September 1974, in Neustadt bei Coburg) is a former German footballer.

References

External links 
 

1974 births
Living people
People from Coburg (district)
Sportspeople from Upper Franconia
German footballers
Association football midfielders
Association football forwards
Bundesliga players
2. Bundesliga players
1. FC Nürnberg players
Dynamo Dresden players
Dynamo Dresden II players
SV Waldhof Mannheim players
Kickers Offenbach players
Footballers from Bavaria